Blinkworthia is a genus of flowering plants belonging to the family Convolvulaceae.

Its native range is Southern China to Indo-China.

Species:

Blinkworthia convolvuloides 
Blinkworthia lycioides

References

Convolvulaceae
Convolvulaceae genera
Taxa named by Jacques Denys Choisy